Louise Lee Si-kei (born 26 September 1950, Tianjin) is a Hong Kong actress and former Chinese Canadian newscaster.

Biography
Louise was crowned in 1968 when she competed in the Hong Kong Princess beauty pageant. Li left Hong Kong in the mid to late 1980s and briefly was a news anchor at Toronto's Chinavision Canada station. She left Canada and returned to Hong Kong to resume her acting career with TVB.

Louise, Liza Wang, Gigi Wong, Angie Chiu were named the 4 most valued TVB actresses in the 1970s and 1980s.

In 2007, she won the coveted Best Actress award in the 40th TVB Anniversary Awards for her role as "Ling Hau" in Heart of Greed.

In 2008, she won the "My Favourite Female Character" at the 41st TVB Anniversary Awards for her role as "Chung Siu-Hor" in Moonlight Resonance.

At the 2010 TVB Anniversary Awards, she won the "Lifetime Acting Achievement Award", being the first to win 3 major awards.

In December 2014, Louise ended her contract with TVB with her last appearance in Romantic Repertoire as Lin Sau-Fong. She will be pursuing acting roles in Mainland China in the future.

Personal life
Louise was treated for cancer and continues to live in Hong Kong and travels to Canada to visit her family. Her daughter is Toronto radio DJ Leslie Yip with A1 Chinese Radio (formerly with Toronto First Radio). She is a Christian and a member of Artistes Christian Fellowship.

Filmography

MediaCorp TV Channel 8 series

TVB Series

Awards and nominations

TVB Anniversary Awards
2007: Best Actress (Heart of Greed)
2008: My Favourite Female Character (Moonlight Resonance)
2010: Lifetime Achievement Award

Others
Astro Wah Lai Toi Drama Awards 2008 – Favourite Leading Actress Award – Role as 'Ling Hau' in Heart of Greed.

Astro Wah Lai Toi Drama Awards 2008 – Most Unforgettable Moment Award – the scene in which she as the 'Dai Kei' quarrels with 'Sai Kei' regarding 'Sai Kei' and Ling Bo handling 'dirty-money' business in Episode 13.

Astro Wah Lai Toi Drama Awards 2008 – Top 12 Favourite Characters Award – one of the character won in the category, as 'Ling Hau' in Heart of Greed too.

References

External links
 

|-
! colspan="3" style="background: #DAA520;" | TVB Anniversary Awards

1950 births
Living people
Canadian film actresses
Canadian television actresses
Canadian television journalists
Hong Kong emigrants to Canada
Hong Kong film actresses
Hong Kong television actresses
Naturalized citizens of Canada
TVB veteran actors
Canadian women television journalists
20th-century Hong Kong actresses
21st-century Hong Kong actresses